Stephen Michael "Steve" Slawson (born 13 November 1972) was an English professional footballer who played as a striker.

References

1972 births
Living people
Footballers from Nottingham
English footballers
Association football forwards
Notts County F.C. players
Burnley F.C. players
Shrewsbury Town F.C. players
Mansfield Town F.C. players
Rotherham United F.C. players
English Football League players
Hucknall Town F.C. players
People from Hucknall
Footballers from Nottinghamshire
Northern Counties East Football League players